Abbott Butte is a summit in the U.S. state of Oregon.

Abbott Butte was named in 1853 for one Hiram Abbott.

References

Buttes of Oregon
Mountains of Douglas County, Oregon
Mountains of Jackson County, Oregon
Mountains of Oregon